Pontefract and District Girls High School (aka Pontefract Girls' High School) was a grammar school for girls in Pontefract, West Yorkshire, England.

History

The school on the site was originally built in the Victorian era as a slaughter house before being demolished. It was established in 1912 and closed when in 1987, Pontefract schools lost their sixth forms, with a sixth form college being established at NEW College, Pontefract on the same site. There was a centenary celebration in 2012.

The school had its own magazine.

After demolition, a Morrisons supermarket was opened on the site.

Notable alumnae
 Jane Brooke, crime writer
 Barbara Castle, Baroness Castle of Blackburn, politician
 Jane Collins, former MEP and UKIP politician
 Shirley Nolan, medical campaigner set up "Anthony Nolan" register
 Karen Wright, contestant on The Great British Baking Show (Collection 6) = The Great British Bake Off (Series 9). She described her school experience in Episode 5, when she made a "Pontefract Girls' School Reunion Spiced Biscuit Chandelier."

See also
 The King's School, Pontefract

References

External links
 

1912 establishments in England
1987 disestablishments in England
Educational institutions established in 1912
Educational institutions disestablished in 1987
Defunct grammar schools in England
Girls' schools in West Yorkshire
Defunct schools in the City of Wakefield
Pontefract